Buddleja crispa, the Himalayan butterfly bush, is a deciduous shrub native to Afghanistan, Bhutan, North India, Nepal, Pakistan and China (Gansu, Sichuan, Tibetan Autonomous Region), where it grows on dry river beds, slopes with boulders, exposed cliffs, and in thickets, at elevations of 1400–4300 m. Named by Bentham in 1835, B. crispa was introduced to cultivation in 1850, and came to be considered one of the more attractive species within the genus; it ranked 8th out of 57 species and cultivars in a public poll organized by the Center for Applied Nursery Research (CANR) at the University of Georgia, US. In the UK, B. crispa was accorded the Royal Horticultural Society's Award of Merit in 1961. However, the species is not entirely cold-hardy, and thus its popularity is not as ubiquitous as it might otherwise be.

Buddleja crispa, after Leeuwenberg
In his 1979 revision of the taxonomy of the African and Asiatic species of Buddleja, the Dutch botanist Toon Leeuwenberg sank five Chinese species as B. crispa on the basis of the similarity in the individual flowers, dismissing the wide ranges in size of both inflorescence and leaf as attributable to environmental factors. It was Leeuwenberg's taxonomy which was adopted in the Flora of China published in 1996. The five former species, still widely recognized in horticulture, are: Buddleja agathosma, Buddleja caryopteridifolia, Buddleja farreri, Buddleja sterniana, and Buddleja tibetica.

Description

The 'original' B. crispa as known to horticulture, cloned from a plant grown at Aldenham, England (see Cultivation), is a comparatively slow growing deciduous shrub of bushy habit, reaching 3.5 m high, more in spread. Young twigs and both sides of the leaves are covered with a white or tawny loose felt. The leaves are ovate-lanceolate, 5–12 cm long by 2.0–4.5 cm wide, with petioles 0,6–2,5 cm. The shrub flowers from February to August. The fragrant flowers form terminal panicles 7–10 cm long by 5 cm wide. The corolla is lilac, with an orange throat. Ploidy 2n = 38 (diploid).

The former species sunk by Leeuwenberg, as listed in the preceding section, have, with the exception of "B. sterniana", inflorescences of varying density < 12  cm long, complemented by leaves of variable size and shape, often covered in a dense white tomentum when young. The exception, "B. sterniana", has markedly smaller inflorescences and leaves < 6  cm long.

Cultivation
Buddleja crispa needs a well-drained soil and full sun; Bean states that it is at its best when grown on a wall. Most if not all the specimens in commerce in the UK derive from a plant in the Aldenham collection amassed by Vicary Gibbs. Hardiness: USDA zones 8–9.

Notable specimens
A particularly tall example of tree-like form > 4.5 m high is grown near an entrance to the grassland and aquatic gardens at the Royal Botanic Gardens, Kew.

Cultivars
 'Huimoon' = selling name

References

Literature
Bean, W. J. (1970). Trees & Shrubs Hardy in the British Isles, 8th ed., Vol. 1.. (2nd impression 1976) London 
Hillier & Sons. (1990). Hillier's Manual of Trees & Shrubs, 5th ed.. David & Charles, Newton Abbot. 
Krüssmann, G. (1984). Manual of Cultivated Broad-leaved Trees & Shrubs, Vol. 1. Engl. transl. London, 1984.
Phillips, R. & Rix, M. (1989). Shrubs, Pan Books, London.
Stuart, D. (2006). Buddlejas. Timber Press, Oregon, USA.  

crispa
Flora of Afghanistan
Flora of China
Flora of the Indian subcontinent
Plants described in 1835